Pablo Cantero; (born 31 October 1977 in Argentina) is an Argentinean retired footballer.

References

Argentine footballers
Living people
1977 births
Association football midfielders
Club Atlético Colón footballers
San Martín de Tucumán footballers
Arsenal de Sarandí footballers
Estudiantes de La Plata footballers
Tiro Federal footballers
Defensores de Belgrano footballers
Club de Gimnasia y Esgrima La Plata footballers